Lake County Airport  is a public airport three miles (5 km) southwest of Lakeview, in Lake County, Oregon.

West Coast DC-3s landed at Lakeview from 1959 until early 1967.

Facilities
(1,617 x 30 m).

In the year ending April 30, 2007 the airport had 6,000 aircraft operations, average 16 per day: 80% general aviation and 20% air taxi. 23 aircraft are based at the airport: 78% single engine, 17% ultralight and 4% multi-engine.

References

External links
 Lake County website about transportation

Airports in Lake County, Oregon
Buildings and structures in Lakeview, Oregon